The Great West League (GWL) was a collegiate summer baseball league founded in 2014, comprising teams from California and Oregon. The league was designed to develop college talent, and only current college eligible players are allowed to participate. League teams were operated just like professional minor league teams. The GWL season ran from early June to mid-August.  The league ceased operations on October 4, 2018.

History
The Great West League was founded in 2014, announcing that teams would be located in California and Oregon, with play beginning with the 2016 season. Former West Coast League president Ken Wilson was named the first president of the league. The Lodi Crushers and Chico Heat became the first two member teams.

One year later, in 2015, the Portland Pickles became the third member team. The Marysville Gold Sox announced they were joining the Great West League in August of that same year. In September, the Sacramento Stealth and the Medford Rogues joined the league, moving from the West Coast League.

The league began play in 2016 with six teams, five of which played a 57-game schedule. The Sacramento Stealth was a travel team, playing a 45-game schedule. The Medford Rogues won the regular season, while the Chico Heat took the Championship Series from the Rogues to become the first GWL Champion. The Chico Heat led the league in attendance, drawing over 50,000 fans and averaging 1,656 per game, while the Portland Pickles drew just less than 50,000, averaging 1,561 per game, second best in the league. A total of 191,629 fans attended GWL games in 2016, an average of 1,176 per game.

Following the 2016 season it was announced that the Lincoln Potters would join the league for the 2017 season, along with the Yuba City Bears. At the same time, it was announced that the Lodi Crushers and Sacramento Stealth would not participate in 2017. That kept the league at six teams, with the league moving to a 60-game balanced schedule for the 2017 season.

The Medford Rogues won the 2017 regular season for the second straight season, but this season also won the Championship Series, downing the Chico Heat. The Portland Pickles drew over 50,000 fans to lead the league in attendance, while the league bested 200,000 in attendance for the first time, including post-season action.

The Klamath Falls Gems joined the league for the 2018 season. The Gems were originally in the WCL and most recently played in the Golden State Collegiate Baseball League. Shortly after the Gems move to the GWL, the Pickles left for the WCL. On November 6, the league announced that the Yuba City Bears were ceasing operations and that the Marysville Gold Sox announced that they were reverting their team name back to the Yuba-Sutter Gold Sox, essentially a merger of the Gold Sox and Bears.  On November 7, the GWL announced the addition of the San Francisco Seals.

On October 4, 2018, the Great West League suspended operations.

Team list

Champions

References

External links
 Great West League official website (on Wayback Machine)

Team websites 
 Chico Heat
 Klamath Falls Gems
 Lincoln Potters
 Medford Rogues
 San Francisco Seals
 Yuba-Sutter Gold Sox

 
Summer baseball leagues
College baseball leagues in the United States
2014 establishments in the United States
Sports leagues established in 2014
Baseball leagues in California
Baseball leagues in Oregon